The 1993–94 Primera División de Fútbol Profesional season also the Copa Taca is the 42nd tournament of El Salvador's Primera División since its establishment of the National League system in 1948. The tournament was scheduled to end in June 11, 1994. Alianza won the championship match against CD FAS.

Teams

Managerial changes

Before the season

During the season

Final

Top scorers

List of foreign players in the league
This is a list of foreign players in 1993-1994. The following players:
have played at least one  game for the respective club.
have not been capped for the El Salvador national football team on any level, independently from the birthplace

C.D. Águila
  Hugo Coria
  Ariel Goldman
  Héctor Fabián Arias
  Daniel Messina

Alianza F.C.
  Martin Di Luca
  Sergio Bufarini
  Hernán Fernando Sosa

Apaneca FC
  Ruben Alonso
  Raúl Esnal

Atletico Marte
  Marcelo Bruno
  Alberto Bica 
  Mario Figueroa 
  Fabián Tejera

Baygon-ADET
  Jorge Martinez Ogaldes

 (player released mid season)
  (player Injured mid season)
 Injury replacement player

Cojutepeque
  Eraldo Correira
  Percival Piggott

C.D. FAS
  Fulgencio Deonel Bordón
  Gabriel Gustavo Perrone

C.D. Luis Ángel Firpo
  Fernando de Moura

Limeno
  Martín Jiménez 
  Miguel Segura
  Idelfonso Bonilla

Tiburones

External links
 
 
 

1991